Samarqand Region (Samarkand Region) is the most populous region of Uzbekistan. It is located in the center of the country in the basin of Zarafshan River. It borders with Tajikistan, Navoiy Region, Jizzakh Region and Qashqadaryo Region.  It covers an area of 16,773 km². The population is estimated to be around 4,031,324, with some 63% living in rural areas (2022).

Samarqand Region was established on January 15, 1938, and is divided into 14 administrative districts and two district-level cities. The capital is Samarkand (pop. est. 551,700, 2021). Other major towns include Bulungʻur, Juma, Ishtixon, Kattakurgan, Urgut, and Oqtosh.

The climate is a typically arid continental climate.

 Samarkand is the second-largest center for economy, science, and culture in Uzbekistan, after Tashkent. The Institute of Archeology at the Academy of Sciences of the Republic of Uzbekistan is based at Samarqand. The region's UNESCO World Heritage Site architectural monuments make Samarkand the largest center for international tourism in the country. 

Samarqand Region also has significant natural resources, including construction materials such as marble, granite, limestone, carbonate, and chalk. The region's major agricultural activities are cotton and cereal growing, winemaking and sericulture. Metal processing (spare parts for automobiles and combines), food processing, textiles, and ceramics are the area's most active industries. 

The region has a well-developed transport infrastructure, with over 400 km of railways and 4100 km of surfaced roads. The telecommunication infrastructure is also well developed.

Administrative divisions

The Samarqand Region consists of 14 districts (listed below) and two district-level cities: Samarkand (Samarqand) and Kattakurgan (Kattaqoʻrgʻon).

There are 11 cities (Samarkand, Kattakurgan, Bulungʻur, Jomboy, Ishtixon, Oqtosh, Payariq, Chelak, Juma, Nurobod, Urgut) and 88 urban-type settlements in the Samarqand Region.

See also 
 List of Hokims of the Samarkand Region

References 

 
Regions of Uzbekistan